Mauro Casagrandi (born Rome, 1940) is an Italian businessman based in Havana, Cuba.

With a right-wing Italian diplomat as a father, he lived in Rome and other cities (Madrid, Barcellona) during his young time.  He moved to Cuba in 1966 shortly after the 1959 Cuban Revolution, as representant of COMEI leading Italian company including FIAT and Olivetti.  En 1982 a knight of the Sovereign Military Order of Malta, he  became the Order's Ambassador to Cuba.

During his overseas travels, he was allegedly approached by the Central Intelligence Agency, who hoped to use him to gather insider information about Fidel Castro's Cuba.  He accepted the offer in Spain in 1975, but intending instead to benefit the Cuban government, which he supported.  He therefore became a double agent of the Cuban regime.

In 1987, he was honored by the Cuban government for managing to infiltrate the CIA. He received the medal of the order of solidarity from President Fidel Castro and Vice President Raul Castro for his service.

In the 1990s however, he started becoming disillusioned with the Cuban ideology.  Many observers believe that he was related to the leak of the classified documents related to the purge of the Centro de Estudios Sobre América.

References

Knights of Malta
Cuban businesspeople
Cuban spies
Italian businesspeople
Living people
1939 births
Ambassadors of the Sovereign Military Order of Malta to Cuba
Italian emigrants to Cuba